The Nokia 2310 is a mobile phone designed for lower budget markets, released in 2006.

Features
 Dual band, GSM 900/1800
 Size 105 x 44 x 19 mm
 Weight 85 g
 Battery talk time 4 – 6 hours
 Battery standby: up to 400 hours
 Colour screen capable of displaying 65,536 colors, 96 x 68 pixel resolution, 4 lines
 FM radio
 Phone book with space for 200 entries
 MP3-grade ringtones
 Loudspeaker to allow hands free calls
 SMS and picture messaging, with space for 60 messages
 Animated screensavers and wallpapers
 3 built-in games (Bounce, Nature Park and Snake Xenzia)
 Alarm clock

Gallery

Reception
Frank Lewis of CNET gave the Nokia 2310 2 out of 5 stars, praising its call quality and battery life, but berating its lack of camera and "poor" screen saying "The Nokia 2310 may be a bargain at just £25, but its screen is too small and range of features too thin on the ground to make it a sensible budget buy."

References

2310
Mobile phones introduced in 2006